The Mercedes-Benz OM611 engine is a straight-4 diesel engine that is produced by Mercedes-Benz.

The W211 E-Class introduced in 2002 were not equipped with the OM611, but with the new OM646 engine.

Technical specifications 

OM611
Diesel engines by model

Straight-four engines